Dangerous Money is a 1924 American silent drama film produced by Famous Players-Lasky and distributed by Paramount Pictures. It was directed by Frank Tuttle and starred popular Bebe Daniels.

Plot

Cast
Bebe Daniels as Adele Clark
Tom Moore as Tim Sullivan
William Powell as Prince Arnolfo da Pescia
Dolores Cassinelli as Signoria Vitale
Mary Foy as "Auntie" Clark
Edward O'Connor as Sheamus Sullivan
Peter Lang as Judge Daniel Orcutt
Charles Slattery as O'Hara
Diana Kane

Preservation
With no copies of Dangerous Money located in any film archives, it is a lost film.

References

External links

American silent feature films
Lost American films
Films based on American novels
Films directed by Frank Tuttle
Paramount Pictures films
American black-and-white films
Silent American drama films
1924 drama films
1924 lost films
Lost drama films
1920s English-language films
1920s American films
Films with screenplays by John Russell (screenwriter)